Etwall railway station is a disused railway station in Etwall, Derbyshire. It was opened by the Great Northern Railway on its Derbyshire Extension in 1878.

History 
From Mickleover the line dropped at about 1 in 110 towards Etwall.

The station was very close to the village, being adjacent to the Uttoxeter road which crossed the line by a steeply sloped bridge. It was provided with substantial brick buildings similar to others on the line; a two-storey station master's house and the usual single storey offices on one platform, with a small timber waiting room on the other. After public services finished, the stationmaster continued to live in the house.

Regular passenger traffic finished in 1939, although the station saw excursions until 1961.

Present day 
The goods yard was sold to an agricultural engineering company who later bought the house and demolished it 1987–8. In the early 2000s, a small housing development was constructed on the site; the road leading into the site being called 'Old Station Close'. The footpath constructed on the old trackbed can be reached from this estate.

References

Disused railway stations in Derbyshire
Railway stations in Great Britain opened in 1878
Railway stations in Great Britain closed in 1939
Former Great Northern Railway stations